Sameodesma is a genus of moths of the family Crambidae described by George Hampson in 1918.

Species
Sameodesma undilinealis Hampson, 1918
Sameodesma xanthocraspia (Hampson, 1913)

References

Spilomelinae
Crambidae genera
Taxa named by George Hampson